Kawaguchi may refer to:

Places
 Kawaguchi, Niigata, a former town in Niigata Prefecture, Japan
 Kawaguchi, Saitama, a city in Saitama Prefecture, Japan
 Kawaguchi Green Center, a city park and botanical garden located in Kawaguchi, Saitama, Japan

Other uses
 Kawaguchi (surname)
 Kawaguchi Detachment, the 35th Infantry Brigade with 124th Infantry Regiment of the Imperial Japanese Army, led by Major General Kiyotaki Kawaguchi during World War II
 7953 Kawaguchi, a main-belt asteroid discovered in 1993
 Lake Kawaguchi, a body of water in Fujikawaguchiko, Yamanashi Prefecture, Japan
 NHK Kawaguchi Transmitter, a medium-wave broadcasting station at Kawaguchi, Saitama, Japan from 1937 to 1982
 Kawaguchi Route (Shuto Expressway)
 Kawaguchi Station, a railway station on the Keihin-Tōhoku Line in Kawaguchi, Saitama Prefecture, Japan
 Nishi-Kawaguchi Station, a railway station on the Keihin-Tōhoku Line in Kawaguchi, Saitama Prefecture, Japan
 Kawaguchi, Brave New World, Ekai Kawaguchi (1866–1945), Japanese Buddhist monk; his name was used as one of the early proponents of Ectogenesis in Aldous Huxley's dystopian Brave New World.